Condition or conditions may refer to:

In philosophy and logic
 Material conditional, a logical connective used to form "if...then..." statements
 Necessary and sufficient condition, a statement which is true if and only if another given statement is true

In science and technology

In computer science
 Exception handling#Condition systems, a generalization of exceptions in exception handling
 Condition (SQL), a filtering mechanism in relational database queries
 Condition variable, a synchronization primitive in concurrent programming

In medicine
 Medical condition, as a synonym for disease
 Medical state or condition, a patient's clinical status in a hospital

In numerical analysis
 Condition number, a measure of a matrix in digital computation

In arts and entertainment
 Condition (film), a 2011 film
 Conditions (album), 2009 debut album by Australian rock band The Temper Trap
 Conditions (magazine), an annual lesbian feminist literary magazine
 Conditions (band), an American rock band
 Just Dropped In (To See What Condition My Condition Was In), a song written by Mickey Newbury and first released in 1967
 Status effect, a temporary condition of a character in computer gaming

Other uses
 Conditions (Russia), part of the constitution of Russia, signed by Anna of Russia in 1730
 In contract law, part of covenants, conditions and restrictions
 Living condition
 State of being

See also
 
 
 Conditional (disambiguation)
 Conditioner (disambiguation)
 Conditioning (disambiguation)
 State (disambiguation)